Lori Jane Powell (November 8, 1971 – November 18, 2021) was a Canadian racquetball player from Prince Albert, Saskatchewan. Powell was Canadian Champion five times: thrice in singles and twice in doubles.  She was forced to retire from competition in 2007 due to a right knee injury.

Professional career 
Powell was ranked in the top 10 rankings of the Women's Professional Racquetball Organization (WPRO) at the end of four seasons. She reached the semi-finals twice, but was never a finalist.

International career 

Powell won gold medals on two of her 18 international appearances with Team Canada. She won singles at the 2004 Pan American Racquetball Championships
and doubles in 2002 with Karina Odegard at the  Pan American Championships. Powell was also part of Team Canada that won the overall team title at the 2000 World Championships, which is the only time the USA has not won that title.

Powell was also a silver medalist in doubles at the 1999 Pan American Games with Debbie Ward, losing the final to Jackie Paraiso and Joy MacKenzie.

Powell was a bronze medalist on four occasions: in singles at the 2003 Pan Am Games and 2001 Pan American Championships and in doubles with Amanda MacDonald at 2003  Pan American Championships and with Josée Grand'Maître at 2006 World Championships, which was Powell's last competition.

Canadian career 

Powell was Canadian Women's Singles Champion three times: in 1995, 2003, and 2004. She was also the Canadian Women's Doubles Champion twice: in 1999 with Debbie Ward and in 2001 with Josée Grand'Maître.

Personal 
Powell earned a B.A. (psychology) and M.S. (kinesiology) from the University of Saskatchewan, and also has certification as both a physical and mental trainer. She ran Powell-Performance, a physical and mental training business, when she lived in Calgary.

Powell received the Women's Award from Racquetball Canada in 2003 in recognition of contributions that advance women in racquetball.  Also, she was the Technical Director for Racquetball Canada from 2004 to 2009.

She was inducted into the Prince Albert Sports Hall of Fame in 2006. Powell was the Prince Albert Female Athlete of the Year in 2000.

Powell died in Calgary after suffering a heart attack in her sleep.

References 

1971 births
2021 deaths
Canadian racquetball players
Sportspeople from Saskatchewan
Pan American Games silver medalists for Canada
Pan American Games bronze medalists for Canada
Pan American Games medalists in racquetball
Racquetball players at the 1999 Pan American Games
Medalists at the 1999 Pan American Games
Sportspeople from Prince Albert, Saskatchewan